Raising Jeffrey Dahmer is a 2006 American drama film based on the case of serial killer Jeffrey Dahmer. The film is directed by Rich Ambler and stars Rusty Sneary as Dahmer, Scott Cordes as his father, and Cathy Barnett as his stepmother.

Premise
The film explores the childhood of Jeffrey Dahmer (Rusty Sneary) and his relationship with his father, Lionel (Scott Cordes), all during a trial in late 1991.

Cast
 Scott Cordes as Lionel Dahmer
 Cathy Barnett as Shari Dahmer
 Rusty Sneary as Jeffrey Dahmer
 Jeannine Hutchings as Catherine Dahmer
 Bo Svenson as Detective John Amos
 Erin McGrane as Joyce Dahmer
 Kip Niven as Attorney Howard Parker

Release
The film premiered at the Kansas City Filmmakers Jubilee on April 13, 2006 and was not released in mainstream theaters. It was later released on DVD on June 24, 2008.

References

External links
 
 
 
 renegade pictures

Films produced by Wood Dickinson
2006 films
2006 drama films
American drama films
Drama films based on actual events
Films set in 1960
Films set in 1969
Films set in 1973
Films set in 1978
Films set in 1988
Films set in 1991
Films set in the 1960s
Films set in the 1970s
Films set in the 1980s
Films set in the 1990s
American independent films
Films about Jeffrey Dahmer
2000s English-language films
2000s American films